Paul Dye Jr. (December 29, 1925 – January 9, 2020), known as Pete Dye, was an American golf course designer and a member of a family of course designers. He was married to fellow designer and amateur champion Alice Dye.

Early life
Dye was born on December 29, 1925, in Urbana, Ohio. He was the son of Paul F. "Pink" and Elizabeth Dye. A few years before Dye's birth, his father became involved with golf and built a nine-hole course on family land in Champaign County called the "Urbana Country Club." As a youngster, he worked and played that course. While attending Urbana High School, he won the Ohio state high school golf championship, and medaled in the state amateur golf championship, all before entering the U.S. Army at age 18 in 1944 during World War II. Dye first moved to Delray Beach, Florida, with his parents in 1933 and eventually established his own winter residence there. With his brother Andy, he had attended the Asheville School, a boarding school in North Carolina at Asheville. Dye entered the Airborne School at Fort Benning in Georgia to be a paratrooper in the 82nd Airborne Division, but the war ended while he was in training. He was stationed at Fort Bragg in North Carolina where he served the rest of his hitch as greenskeeper on the base golf course. Dye explained,

"I played the golf course at Pinehurst No. 2 for six solid months, and I got to know Mr. Donald Ross...(who) had built the Fort Bragg golf course. He would come over and watch us play golf, and most of the time the captain and colonel hauled me over there. They didn't know who Mr. Ross was, but the other fellow walking with him was JC Penney, and they all knew him."

After Dye's discharge, he relocated to Florida and enrolled at Rollins College in Winter Park, northeast of Orlando, where he met his wife, Alice Holliday O'Neal. They were married in early 1950, and had two sons, Perry and P.B. (Paul Burke). They moved to Indiana to her hometown of Indianapolis, and Dye sold insurance. Within a few years, he distinguished himself as a million dollar salesman, and was also successful in amateur golf. Dye won the Indiana amateur championship in 1958, following runner-up finishes in 1954 and 1955.

Design career
Dye made the decision to become a golf course designer in his mid-30s. Alice supported his career change and became partner in the new venture. In 1961, the couple visited and talked to noted golf architect Bill Diddle, who lived nearby. He warned them about the economic uncertainty of the profession, but they persisted. The first design from Dye and his wife was the nine-hole El Dorado course south of Indianapolis, which crossed a creek thirteen times. Those nine holes are now incorporated into the Royal Oak course at Dye's Walk Country Club. Their first 18-hole course was created during 1962 in Indianapolis and named Heather Hills, now known as Maple Creek Golf & Country Club.

Dye designed the Radrick Farms Golf Course for the University of Michigan in 1962, but the course did not open until 1965. At the time, he was using the design style of Trent Jones, but after seeing the work of Alister MacKenzie, who designed the 1931 Michigan course, Dye decided to incorporate features from two greens into his next project. Dye visited Scotland in 1963 and made a thorough study of its classic courses. The Scottish use of pot bunkers, bulkheads constructed of wood, and diminutive greens influenced his subsequent designs.

Dye's first well-known course was Crooked Stick Golf Club in Carmel, Indiana, north of Indianapolis, begun in 1964. It hosted the PGA Championship in 1991, won by ninth alternate John Daly. In 1967, he designed The Golf Club near Columbus, Ohio, where he solicited input from 27-year-old Jack Nicklaus, an area local who won his seventh major (of 18) that year. The two worked together to design the acclaimed Harbour Town Golf Links in South Carolina, opened in 1969, the site of an annual PGA Tour event ever since. Nicklaus credits Dye with significant influence on his own approach to golf course design. Also in 1969, Dye designed his first course in Florida called Delray Dunes.  In 1970, he designed Martingham Golf Course in St. Michaels, Maryland, now known as Harbourtowne Resort. The owners of the project went bankrupt and Dye went unpaid; the course was eventually finished, however, and had many of Dye's signature course characteristics such as deep bunkers, small greens, short challenging par fours, and railroad ties. In 2015, the property was purchased by Richard D. Cohen who has entered into an agreement with Dye to update and redesign the course. The new owner agreed to pay the funds that were not paid during the original design.

In 1986, Dye also designed a course in the Italian province of Brescia, near Lake Iseo, the Franciacorta Golf Club, recognized today as wine golf course. Dye is considered to be one of the most influential course architects in the world. His designs are known for distinctive features, including small greens and the use of railroad ties to hold bunkers. His design for the Brickyard Crossing golf course at the Indianapolis Motor Speedway utilized the dismantled outer retaining wall from the race track. He is known for designing the "world's most terrifying tee shot,"  the par-3 17th hole of the Stadium Course at TPC at Sawgrass in Ponte Vedra Beach, Florida. Known as the "Island Green," it gained wide notice  in 1982, during the first Players Championship at the new course. Dye's designs have been credited with returning short & medium length par fours to golf. Many of the best young golf architects have "pushed dirt" for Pete, including Bill Coore, Tom Doak, John Harbottle, Butch Laporte, Tim Liddy, Scott Poole, David Postlewaite, Lee Schmidt, Keith Sparkman, Jim Urbina, Bobby Weed, Rod Whitman, and Abe Wilson.

Later life
Dye received the Old Tom Morris Award in 2003 from the Golf Course Superintendents Association of America, their highest honor. In 2004, he was the recipient of the PGA Distinguished Service Award, the highest annual honor of the PGA of America, which recognizes individuals who display leadership and humanitarian qualities, including integrity, sportsmanship and enthusiasm for the game of golf. In 2005, Dye became the sixth recipient of the PGA Tour Lifetime Achievement Award. He was inducted into the World Golf Hall of Fame in November 2008 in the Lifetime Achievement category. The American Society of Golf Course Architects bestowed the Donald Ross Award on Dye in 1995. Dye was named Architect of the Year by Golf World magazine, awarded a Doctor of Landscape Architecture degree from Purdue University, received Indiana's Sagamore of the Wabash award and was honored as Family of the Year by the National Golf Foundation.

In the last years of his life, Dye suffered from Alzheimer's disease. He died on January 9, 2020.

Courses designed
A partial list of courses that Dye either designed alone or co-designed:

Public
 California
 Carmel Valley Ranch Golf Resort – Carmel Valley Ranch 
 La Quinta Resort and Club (Dunes Course, Mountain Course) – La Quinta 
 PGA West (Stadium Course) – La Quinta 
 Lost Canyons Golf Club (Shadow Course, Sky Course) – Simi Valley 
 The Westin Mission Hills Resort & Spa (South Course) – Rancho Mirage 
Trump National Golf Club in Los Angeles
 Colorado
 The Country Club of Colorado – Colorado Springs 
 Plum Creek Golf Club – Castle Rock 
 Riverdale Dunes – Brighton 
 Gypsum Creek Golf Course – Gypsum 
 Copper Creek Golf Course – Copper Mountain
 Connecticut
 Wintonbury Hills Golf Course – Bloomfield 
 TPC River Highlands – Cromwell
 Florida
 Amelia Island Plantation - Ocean Links - Amelia Island, Florida
 Gasparilla Inn Golf Course – Boca Grande 
 Palm Beach Polo (The Cypress Course) – Wellington 
 PGA Golf Club (The Dye Course) – Port St. Lucie
 River Ridge Golf Course – Harbour Ridge | Palm City – Treasure Coast – Florida Golf Communities 
 TPC at Sawgrass (Stadium Course) – Ponte Vedra Beach 
 TPC at Sawgrass (Dye Valley Course) - Ponte Vedra Beach 
 Illinois
 Ruffled Feathers Golf Course – Lemont 
 Tamarack Country Club – Shiloh
 Yorktown Golf Course – Belleville 
 Indiana
 Birck Boilermaker Golf Complex at Purdue University (Ackerman-Allen Course, Kampen Course) – West Lafayette 
 Brickyard Crossing – Speedway 
 The Club at Chatham Hills (semi-private) – Westfield
 Eagle Creek Golf Club (Pines and Sycamore Courses) at Eagle Creek Park – Indianapolis 
 Forest Park – Brazil
 The Fort Golf Course – Fort Harrison State Park – Indianapolis 
 Greenbelt Golf Course – Columbus 
 The Camferdam Golf Experience (The Indianapolis Children's Museum) - Indianapolis, Indiana 
 Maple Creek Country Club – Indianapolis, Indiana—The very first course designed by Pete (and Alice) Dye in 1961, originally named 'Heather Hills.'https://www.maplecreekgc.com/
 Mystic Hills Golf Course – Culver 
 Oak Tree Golf Course (front nine) – Plainfield 
 The Pete Dye Course – French Lick 
 Plum Creek Golf Club – Carmel 
 Sahm Golf Course – Indianapolis 
 Louisiana
TPC of Louisiana – Avondale 
 Kentucky
Kearney Hill Golf Links – Lexington 
Peninsula Golf Course – Lancaster
 Maryland
 Bulle Rock Golf Course – Havre de Grace 
 The Links at Perry Cabin (formerly Harbourtowne Resort Country Club) – St. Michaels 
 Rum Pointe Seaside Golf Links – Berlin 
 Nevada
 Paiute Golf Club Resort (Snow Mountain, Sun Mountain, and Wolf Courses) – Las Vegas 
 Desert Pines Golf Club – Las Vegas 
 New York
 Pound Ridge Golf Club – Pound Ridge 
 North Carolina
 Cardinal by Pete Dye – Greensboro 
 Founders Golf Course – Southport 
 Oak Hollow Golf Course – High Point 
 Ohio
 Avalon Lakes – Warren
 Fowler's Mill GC – Chesterland 
 Little Turtle Golf Club – Westerville 
Pennsylvania
 Iron Valley Golf Course – Lebanon
 Mystic Rock, Nemacolin Woodlands Resort – Farmington
 South Carolina
 Harbour Town Golf Links – Hilton Head Island 
 Kiawah Island Golf Resort (The Ocean Course) – Kiawah Island 
 Heron Point (formerly Sea Marsh) – Hilton Head Island 
 The Dye Club at Barefoot Resort – North Myrtle Beach
 Prestwick Country Club – Myrtle Beach
 Texas
 Stonebridge Ranch Country Club (The Dye Course) – McKinney
 AT&T Canyons Course of TPC at San Antonio
 Virginia
 Pete Dye River Course of Virginia Tech – Radford 
 River Course at Kingsmill Resort – Williamsburg
 Virginia Beach National – Virginia Beach 
 Virginia Oaks – Gainesville 
 Wisconsin
 Big Fish Golf Club – Hayward 
 Whistling Straits (Irish Course, Straits Course) – Haven 
 Blackwolf Run (River Course, Meadows Valley Course) – Kohler 
 Dominican Republic
 Casa de Campo (Teeth of the Dog, Dye Fore, The Links) – 
 Las Aromas Golf Club - 
 Guatemala
 Fuego Maya – La Reunion 
 Israel
 Caesarea Golf & Country Club – Caesarea

Private
 Arizona
 Ancala Country Club – Scottsdale 
 Red Mountain Ranch Country Club (Championship Course) – Mesa 
 California
  The Citrus Golf Club - La Quinta
  Mission Hills Country Club Pete Dye Course - Rancho Mirage
  The Hideaway Golf Club Pete Dye Course - La Quinta
 Colorado
 Glenmoor Country Club – Cherry Hills Village 
 Florida
 Delray Dunes Golf and Country Club- Boynton Beach, Florida 
 The Dye Preserve Golf Club - Jupiter 
 Gulf Stream Golf Club - (Pete and Alice Dye - 2014 Remodel) Gulf Stream 
 Talis Park Golf Club (with Greg Norman) – Naples 
 Harbour Ridge Yacht & Country Club (River Ridge Course) Palm City 
 North Course - (John's Island Club, Vero Beach, FL) (Pete and Perry Dye) Vero Beach 
 South Course - (John's Island Club, Vero Beach, FL) (Pete Dye and Jack Nicklaus) Vero Beach 
 Southern Hills Plantation Club – Brooksville 
 Medalist Golf Club (with Greg Norman) – Jupiter  
 The Moorings Club of Vero Beach – Vero Beach 
 Old Marsh Golf Club – Palm Beach Gardens, Florida 
 Pete Dye Course - (PGA Golf Club at the Reserve) – Port Saint Lucie, Florida 
 Harbor Course – ((Grand Harbor, Vero Beach, FL))  
 St. Andrews Club - Delray Beach, FL 
 West Bay Club (Estero, FL) (Pete and P.B Dye) 
 Georgia
 Atlanta National Golf Club – Alpharetta 
 Illinois
 Oakwood Country Club  – Coal Valley 
 Indiana
 The Bridgewater Club – Westfield 
 The Club at Chatham Hills - Westfield
 Crooked Stick Golf Club – Carmel 
Dye's Walk Country Club (formerly Eldorado Country Club and Royal Oak) – Greenwood 
 Harbour Trees Golf Club - Noblesville 
 Maple Creek Golf & Country Club – Indianapolis 
 Woodland Country Club – Carmel 
 The Club at Holliday Farms - Zionsville 
 Iowa
 Des Moines Golf and Country Club – West Des Moines 
 Louisiana
 Belle Terre Country Club – LaPlace 
 Michigan
 Radrick Farms Golf Course at the University of Michigan – Ann Arbor 
 Wabeek Country Club – Bloomfield Hills 
Missouri
Boone Valley Golf Club – Augusta 
Old Hickory Golf Club – St. Peters 
 Nebraska
  – Lincoln 
 North Carolina
 Country Club of Landfall – Wilmington 
 Ohio
 The Golf Club – New Albany
 Little Turtle Golf Club – Westerville 
 Oklahoma
 Oak Tree National – Edmond 
 Oak Tree Country Club – Edmond 
 Pennsylvania
 Montour Heights Country Club – Coraopolis 
 South Carolina
 DeBordieu Club – Georgetown 
 Long Cove Club – Hilton Head Island 
 Colleton River Plantation Club (Dye Course) – Bluffton 
 Hampton Hall Club- Bluffton 
 Tennessee
 The Honors Golf Club – Ooltewah
 Rarity Mountain Golf Club – Jellico
 Texas
 Austin Country Club – Austin
 The Stonebridge Ranch Country Club – McKinney 
 Utah
Promontory  – Park City
West Virginia
 Pete Dye Golf Club – Clarksburg 
 Curacao
 Santa Barbara Beach Resort (Old Quarry Golf Course) – Curacao 
 China 
 Mission Hills Dongguan - Pete Dye Course, Mission Hills China
 Dominican Republic
 La Romana Country Club – La Romana
 Honduras
 Pristine Bay Resort - Roatán
 Israel
 Caesarea Golf Club (2009 course redesign)
 Italy
 Franciacorta Golf Club – Franciacorta, Sebino, (Brescia) 
 Switzerland
 Golf Club du Domaine Impérial - Gland, Vaud

References

Further reading

External links
Course Map
Pete Dye Golf Club
American Society of Golf Course Architects profile
Bio from Dye Designs
Time – Top 10 Most Difficult Golf Courses Pete Dye nickname Marquis de Sod (Doc D.)

American male golfers
Golf course architects
American landscape architects
World Golf Hall of Fame inductees
Golfers from Ohio
Rollins College alumni
Asheville School alumni
People from Urbana, Ohio
People from Carmel, Indiana
United States Army personnel of World War II
Military personnel from Ohio
1925 births
2020 deaths
United States Army soldiers
Paratroopers